Alicarte is a surname. Notable people with the surname include:

Bruno Alicarte (born 1972), French footballer
Hervé Alicarte (born 1974), French footballer, brother of Bruno

See also
 Alicante